James Hogan (1928 – 27 November 2010) was an Irish hurler who played as a right corner-back for the Kilkenny senior team from 1950 until 1957.

Hogan made his first appearance for the team during the 1950 championship and became a regular member of the panel over the next decade. During that time he won one All-Ireland winner's medal as a non-playing substitute and two Leinster winner's medals.

At club level Hogan played with the Tullaroan club, winning two county club championship winners' medal.

References

1928 births
2010 deaths
Tullaroan hurlers
Kilkenny inter-county hurlers
Leinster inter-provincial hurlers